Dirk Wiese may refer to:

 Dirk Wiese (bobsleigh), German bobsledder
 Dirk Wiese (politician) (born 1983), German politician